James Gowans may refer to:

Sir James Gowans (architect) (1821–1890), Scottish architect and quarry owner
James Gowans (rugby union) (1872–1936), Scottish rugby union player
Sir James Learmonth Gowans (1924–2020), English immunologist
James Gowans (Australian footballer) (born 1977), Australian footballer

See also
James Gowan (1923–2015), Scottish-born architect
James Robert Gowan (1815–1909), Canadian lawyer, judge, and senator